Ranch Romance was a western swing, alternative country and bluegrass band from Seattle, Washington consisting of vocalist and rhythm guitarist Jo Miller, upright bassist Nancy Katz, fiddler Barbara Lamb, mandolinist Lisa Theo, accordionist Nova Karina Devonie and guitarist, mandolinist and banjo player David Keenan.

The band's name was taken from a Western pulp fiction magazine published in the US in the 1930s called Ranch Romances.

"[i]n 1989, they issued their debut LP, Western Dream. After touring in support of k.d. lang, Theo left the band in 1991 and was replaced by accordionist Nova Karina Devonie and David Keenen on guitar, mandolin, and banjo. Lamb departed to attempt a solo career prior to the release of the second Ranch Romance effort, Blue Blazes; Flip City followed in 1993."

Discography

Albums

References

External links

All Music Guide to Country Music
Ranch Romance on Seattle TV circa 1990

American folk musical groups
American bluegrass music groups
Old-time bands
Musical groups from Seattle